The Immigrant is a 2013 American drama film directed by James Gray, starring Marion Cotillard, Joaquin Phoenix, and Jeremy Renner. It was nominated for the Palme d'Or at the 2013 Cannes Film Festival.

Plot
In 1921, Polish Catholic sisters Ewa (Marion Cotillard) and Magda (Angela Sarafyan) arrive at Ellis Island, New York City as immigrants looking for a better life after escaping their ravaged home in post–Great War Poland. Magda is quarantined because of her lung disease. Ewa is almost deported, but Bruno (Joaquin Phoenix), who is Jewish and claims to be from the Travelers' Aid Society,  notices her and her fluency in English, bribes an officer to let her go, and takes her to his house. Knowing Ewa has to make money to get Magda released, Bruno lets her dance at the Bandits' Roost theater and prostitutes her. Bruno also becomes interested in her romantically.

Ewa looks for her expatriate relatives living in New York, but her uncle by marriage turns her in to the authorities; he says he had heard she had got in trouble for engaging in illicit behavior on the ship from Europe, and he wishes to distance himself from sheltering a prostitute. Policemen take her back to Ellis Island, and once again she is slated for deportation. While at Ellis Island Ewa watches a performance by Emil (Bruno's cousin, making a living as a performing illusionist called Orlando; played by Jeremy Renner); after his performance he hands her a white rose. The next morning Bruno manages to get her released.

Ewa meets Emil again at the Bandit's Roost. Emil asks Ewa to come onstage to aid him in his mind reading trick, but the men in the audience start catcalling at Ewa. The scene ends in a brawl between Bruno and Emil and with Bruno and the girls being fired from the theater. Soon after Bruno has his "doves" parade around Central Park to attract men to sleep with them. Another encounter between Emil and Ewa proves Emil's feelings for her. Emil falls for Ewa, much to Bruno's discontent, which causes continued and intense conflicts between the two men. One violent conflict concludes with Bruno being jailed overnight.

One day, Emil sneaks into Bruno's home to see Ewa. While there, he promises to get her the money to save her sister so they can all leave New York together. Coincidentally, shortly after making such promise, Emil hides as Bruno returns. Bruno also makes a promise to Ewa: he is to arrange for her a meeting with her sister. But Emil interrupts Bruno, as he pulls out an unloaded gun and points it at Bruno. Emil pulls the trigger just to frighten him, but his attempt at intimidating Bruno backfires, as Bruno stabs him to death in apparent self-defense.

Overcoming the shock and distress of the death, Bruno and Ewa dump Emil's body in the street at night to get rid of unwanted police investigations, but the police are told by another prostitute with whom Ewa had had conflicts that Ewa killed Emil. Bruno hides Ewa from the police, who then give him a severe beating and steal a large bundle of money he had been carrying. Ewa learns Bruno had enough money to pay for her sister's release all along but was hiding it from her as he did not want her to leave him. Bruno claims he has now had a change of heart and would help Ewa and her sister if he had any money. Ewa makes another contact with her aunt and successfully pleads for her aunt to give her the money for Magda. With it, Bruno pays his contact on Ellis Island to release Ewa's sister and gives them both tickets to California. Ewa and Magda leave, while a repentant Bruno stays in New York, intending to confess to the police about Emil's killing.

Cast

 Marion Cotillard as Ewa Cybulska
 Joaquin Phoenix as Bruno Weiss
 Jeremy Renner as Orlando the Magician / Emil
 Yelena Solovey as Rosie Hertz
 Dagmara Dominczyk as Belva
 Maja Wampuszyc as Aunt Edyta
 Angela Sarafyan as Magda Cybulska
 Ilia Volok as Wojtek
 Antoni Corone as Thomas MacNally
 Peter McRobbie as Dr. Knox
 Kevin Cannon as Missionary
 Sofia Black-D'Elia as Not Magda

Production 
The working titles of the film were Low Life and The Nightingale.

Director James Gray said The Immigrant is "80% based on the recollections from my grandparents, who came to the United States in 1923", and he described it as "my most personal and autobiographical film to date". He was also inspired by Giacomo Puccini's operas that comprise Il Trittico.

James Gray wrote the movie for Marion Cotillard and Joaquin Phoenix. He stated that if they hadn't wanted to do the movie, he's not sure he would have made it. When Gray was trying to think of a movie for Cotillard, he was talking to his brother, who found these journals from their grandfather who ran a saloon in the Lower East Side in New York in the 1920s, after he came from Kiev, and there were all these low lives frequenting the place. One of them was this what Gray describes as a "enigmatic, screwed-up, manipulative pimp who used to go to Ellis Island and cruise for women who came to the country by themselves." According to Gray in the 1920s, women trying to get into the U.S. by themselves were not let in specifically because they were targets for prostitution, but through bribery, canny pimps would get around these rules. And so a movie idea was born. Gray said that he had never seen a movie on that subject. "Lower East Side, Ellis Island, pimps; it seemed very vivid to me. So I said, 'that sounds perfect,'" he told. However, getting Cotillard on board wasn't as easy as he'd hoped. The director described sending the screenplay to Cotillard, but then having to wait seven days for an answer after she had promised to read the script over a weekend. "Well, Sunday came and went and it was like getting a colonoscopy over a week," he said of the agonizing wait for an answer.

Gray also stated that Cotillard is the best actor he's ever worked with.

Because Gray wrote about 20 pages of dialogue in Polish, Cotillard had to learn Polish to take on the role and speak English with a credible Polish accent. Cotillard had only two months to learn her Polish dialogue.

Filming
Principal photography on the film began on January 27, 2012 in New York City, under the working title "Low Life". Filming was completed on March 17, 2012.

Release
In June 2012, The Weinstein Company acquired U.S. distribution rights. Though the film was completed in time for 2012's Toronto Film Festival, U.S. distributor The Weinstein Company insisted on holding it until Cannes 2013, with Harvey Weinstein hoping he might convince the director to change the ending. James Gray didn't change the ending and the film was only released in the U.S. in 2014.

The Immigrant screened at the 2013 Cannes Film Festival, the 2013 Rio de Janeiro International Film Festival, the 2013 New York Film Festival, the 2013 Chicago International Film Festival, the 2014 Miami International Film Festival, the 2014 Newport Beach International Film Festival and the 2014 Sedona Film Festival.

The film was released in the United States on May 16, 2014.

Reception

Critical response
The Immigrant received generally positive reviews from critics. Rotten Tomatoes gives the film a score of 86% based on 111 reviews, with an average score of 7.45/10; the general consensus states: "Beautiful visuals, James Gray's confident direction, and a powerful performance from Marion Cotillard combine to make The Immigrant a richly rewarding period drama." Metacritic gave the film a rating of 77/100, based on 34 reviews.

Michael Phillips of Chicago Tribune described the film as "Gray's most satisfying to date, an ode to melodrama of another day, done with style and surprising restraint." Ignatiy Vishnevetsky of The A.V. Club lauded it as an "American masterpiece," claiming: "Gray is the most underappreciated of this country's major filmmakers; his movies distill a century's worth of American feature film—a little late silent cinema here, a little New Hollywood there—into a distinctly personal style. ... What makes The Immigrant a great film is the way in which Gray uses actors and his mastery of the unspoken to create a tremendously lived-in, felt-through world. Every space—public or private, interior or exterior—feels authentic, historically and emotionally."  Ed Gonzalez of Slant Magazine gave the film 3 and a half out of 4 stars, saying that "The Immigrant feels closer in spirit to Roberto Rossellini's collaborations with Ingrid Bergman" and calling it "Gray's Voyage to Italy".

Brian Clark of Twitch Film gave the film a mixed review, commenting that "while the film boasts great performances, the narrative and overall drama lacks the ferocity, momentum and intensity of Gray's other work". Lee Marshall of Screen International in his unfavorable review wrote that "though Gray offers a well-crafted package, especially on the visual front, there's surprisingly little contemporary resonance in this immigration melodrama".

Time magazine ranked Marion Cotillard's performance in the film as the fourth best performance of 2014, shared with her performance in Two Days, One Night.

Accolades

References

External links
 
 
 
 

2013 films
2013 drama films
American drama films
2010s English-language films
2010s Polish-language films
Films about immigration to the United States
Films about prostitution in the United States
Films directed by James Gray
Films set in 1921
Films set in New York City
Films shot in New York City
Films shot in New Jersey
Films with screenplays by James Gray
Statue of Liberty in fiction
Worldview Entertainment films
2013 multilingual films
American multilingual films
2010s American films